Startsev (from старец meaning an old man) is a Russian masculine surname, its feminine counterpart is Startseva. It may refer to:

Andrej Startsev (born 1994), Kazakhstani-German football player
Kirill Startsev (born 1989), Russian ice hockey player
Maksym Startsev (born 1980), Ukrainian football goalkeeper 
Osip Startsev, Russian architect of 17th–18th centuries
Yevgeniya Startseva (born 1989), Russian volleyball player 

Russian-language surnames